GS-39783 is a compound used in scientific research which acts as a positive allosteric modulator at the GABAB receptor. It has been shown to produce anxiolytic effects in animal studies, and reduces self-administration of alcohol, cocaine and nicotine.

References 

Nitropyrimidines
Thioethers
GABAB receptor positive allosteric modulators
Cyclopentanes